The Challenge Cup of Rugby league was instituted in the 1896–97 and the final was contested between Batley and St. Helens at Headingley, Leeds. In the seasons during the Second World War the final was played over two legs, with the aggregate score being used. The final was played at many neutral venues up to and including 1928 after which it was mostly played at Wembley Stadium until 1939 just prior to the Second World War apart from 1932 when it was switched to Central Park, Wigan. In the war years, apart from 1940, it was played at various venues between 1941–45 after which it returned to Wembley in 1946 when the final permanently became a Wembley final.

In 1909–10 Leeds and Hull F.C. drew 7–7 for the first time in a final at Huddersfield and a replay resulted in a Leeds win. There have been 3 replays, the latest being 1981–82 at Elland Road between Hull F.C. and Widnes. In 2015 Leeds beat Hull Kingston Rovers 50–0 in the biggest win in Challenge Cup final history.

List of Finals

Notes
a: The 2020 final was played behind closed doors due to the Covid 19 Pandemic.
b: The 2021 final was played in front of a restricted crowd of 40,000 due to the Covid 19 Pandemic.

Results by club

Venues

Current venue

Former venues

The Challenge Cup final has been held at 12 neutral venues.

Replay venues
In the event of a draw a replay will be played at a neutral venue. There have been three replays.

See also

References

External links

 
Rugby league-related lists